"Smoldering Children" is the tenth episode of the first season of the television series American Horror Story, which premiered on the network FX on December 7, 2011. The episode was written by James Wong and directed by Michael Lehmann. This episode is rated TV-MA (LV).

In this episode, the reason for Larry's (Denis O'Hare) burns are revealed, while Violet (Taissa Farmiga) learns a shocking truth. Charles S. Dutton guest stars as Detective Granger.

Plot
Flashing back to 1994, after Larry Harvey's wife, Lorraine, kills herself and their daughters, Constance, Tate, and Addie move into the house with Larry. On Thanksgiving, Tate berates Larry for killing Beau and his naivety with Constance. Tate also resents Constance for this. Tate, high on cocaine and crystal meth, goes to Larry's office and immolates him, before committing the school shooting ("Piggy Piggy").

Ben visits Vivien in the ward, and apologizes. He tells her he believes her claims that she was raped, and she will be discharged soon. He also tells her that the rapist fathered one of the twins.

Detectives tell Constance of Travis' murder, and she confronts Larry, believing he killed Travis out of jealousy. Larry says a ghost killed Travis in the house. Constance says she never loved him. A truant officer informs Ben that Violet has skipped school for sixteen days.

Detectives take Constance in for questioning over Travis' death. They mention the district attorney intended to charge her with the murder of her husband Hugo and Moira, but could not find the bodies.

Larry enters the house and sees his daughters and wife. He apologizes to Lorraine and swears to get revenge on Constance, but she tells him that he broke their wedding vows, not Constance.

Wearing the Rubber Man suit, Tate attacks Ben with chloroform. Ben fights him and pulls off his mask, seeing Tate's face before going unconscious. Tate tries to convince Violet to commit suicide. Violet flees, but is unable to leave the house. Tate shows Violet her decaying corpse; she did not survive a suicide attempt ("Piggy Piggy"). Tate has also known that he too was a ghost the entire time.

Constance learns that Larry has confessed to the murder. She visits him in jail, and he explains he confessed to pay for his sins, but will be able to handle his punishment if Constance will just say she loves him. Constance coldly refuses and leaves.

Production
The episode was written by co-executive producer James Wong, while being directed by Michael Lehmann.

Taissa Farmiga had guessed that Violet was dead early on from hints dropped in earlier scripts, though the staff were not allowed to confirm her suspicions. Though series co-creator Ryan Murphy had planned for Violet to be dead for a long time, he kept this information from the staff, and intentionally wrote the suicide scene in Episode 6, "Piggy Piggy" to be vague. Murphy only revealed Violet's death to the other writers while they were writing Episode 8, "Rubber Man". Both Murphy and Farmiga described the scene revealing Violet's death as "emotional." Violet's decaying corpse was a prosthetic made from a mold of Farmiga's body. Farmiga had not seen the prosthetic until shooting; Murphy claims that Violet's reaction during the close up of the reveal is Farmiga's response to seeing herself dead for the first time.

Murphy sensed audience concerns that the previous two episodes, "Rubber Man" and "Spooky Little Girl", were straying from the main characters of the show, moving Vivien away from the house and introducing the character of The Black Dahlia. Thus, Murphy intended this and the remaining episodes to focus more on the Harmon family and the outcome of their experiences in the house.

Reception
"Smoldering Children" received critical acclaim; Rotten Tomatoes reports a 100% approval rating, based on 8 reviews. The Star-Ledger James Queally commented on the episode, saying, "Every week, I think I have American Horror Story figured out... the show sits down, shuts up, straps in and delivers an effective, character-driven story like "Smoldering Children"." The A.V. Club Emily VanDerWerff said this about the episode, "I could make a number of complaints if pressed, since there were the usual dumb moments, character beats, and lines of dialogue, but... this was awesomely pulpy genre fun." She gave the episode an A grade. Matt Fowler from IGN gave the episode a rating of 8.5/10, citing it as "great."

In its original American broadcast, "Smoldering Children" was seen by an estimated 2.54 million household viewers and gained a 1.6 rating share among adults aged 18–49, according to Nielsen Media Research. The episode was down one tenth from the previous episode.

References

External links

 
  "Smoldering Children" at TV Guide.com

American Horror Story: Murder House episodes
Fiction set in 1994
Television episodes set in psychiatric hospitals